"Was There Anything I Could Do?" is a song by the Australian alternative rock band The Go-Betweens that was issued as the second single from their sixth album 16 Lovers Lane. The song was released 3 October 1988 by Beggars Banquet Records in the UK and Mushroom Records in Australia but failed to chart in either region. It was released as a promotional single in the US by Capitol Records and charted on Billboard's Modern Rock Tracks charts in the United States, peaking at No. 16.

"Was There Anything I Could Do?" was not necessarily the unanimous choice by all members of the band, with claims by some that they wanted Forster's "Clouds" whilst McLennan pushed for the song as it was more driving and anthemic.

Cover versions 
The song was covered by Maxïmo Park and included on a limited edition compilation album, released in July 2008 to celebrate the launch of Independents Day.

In 2010 a cover of the song by The Buzzards, was included on a Go-Betweens tribute album, Right Here.

Franz Ferdinand in November 2013 covered the song on Triple J's Like a Version programme.

In 2014 a cover of the song by Missy Higgins was included on her album, Oz.

Track listing

Original 7" Vinyl release
 "Was There Anything I Could Do?" - 3:06
 "Rock and Roll Friend" - 3:30

Original 12" Vinyl release
 "Was There Anything I Can Do?" - 3:06
 "Rock and Roll Friend" - 3:30
 "Mexican Postcard" - 2:13

Original CD single release
 "Was There Anything I Can Do?" - 3:06
 "Rock and Roll Friend" - 3:30
 "Mexican Postcard" - 2:13
 "Bye Bye Pride" - 4:06

Release history

Notes
A. :The US release was a 12" promotional release with "Was There Anything I Could Do?" on each side.

Charts

References

External links 
 [ "Was There Anything I Could Do?"] @ AllMusic
 "Was There Anything I Could Do?" @ MusicBrainz
 "Was There Anything I Could Do?" @ Discogs
 Video
 Alternate Video

1988 singles
The Go-Betweens songs
1988 songs
Mushroom Records singles
Beggars Banquet Records singles
Songs written by Grant McLennan
Songs written by Robert Forster (musician)